Sea snakes, or coral reef snakes, are elapid snakes that inhabit marine environments for most or all of their lives. They belong to two subfamilies, Hydrophiinae and Laticaudinae. Hydrophiinae also includes Australasian terrestrial snakes, whereas Laticaudinae only includes the sea kraits (Laticauda), of which three species are found exclusively in freshwater. If these three freshwater species are excluded, there are 69 species of sea snakes divided between seven genera.

Most sea snakes are venomous, except the genus Emydocephalus, which feeds almost exclusively on fish eggs. Sea snakes are extensively adapted to a fully aquatic life and are unable to move on land, except for the sea kraits, which have limited land movement. They are found in warm coastal waters from the Indian Ocean to the Pacific and are closely related to venomous terrestrial snakes in Australia.

All sea snakes have paddle-like tails and many have laterally compressed bodies that give them an eel-like appearance. Unlike fish, they do not have gills and must surface regularly to breathe. Along with whales, they are among the most completely aquatic of all extant air-breathing vertebrates. Among this group are species with some of the most potent venoms of all snakes. Some have gentle dispositions and bite only when provoked, while others are much more aggressive.

Description
Their eyes are relatively small with a round pupil and most have nostrils located dorsally. The skulls do not differ significantly from those of terrestrial elapids, although their dentition is relatively primitive with short fangs and (with the exception of Emydocephalus) as many as 18 smaller teeth behind them on the maxilla.

Most sea snakes are completely aquatic and have adapted to sea environments in many ways, the most characteristic of which is a paddle-like tail that has improved their swimming ability. To a varying degree, the bodies of many species are laterally compressed, especially in the pelagic species. This has often caused the ventral scales to become reduced in size, even difficult to distinguish from the adjoining scales. Their lack of ventral scales means they have become virtually helpless on land, but as they live out their entire lifecycles at sea, they have no need to leave the water.

The only genus that has retained the enlarged ventral scales is the sea kraits, Laticauda, with only five species. These snakes are considered to be more primitive, as they still spend much of their time on land, where their ventral scales afford them the necessary grip. Laticauda species are also the only sea snakes with internasal scales; that is, their nostrils are not located dorsally.

Since a snake's tongue can fulfill its olfactory function more easily under water, its action is short compared to that of terrestrial snake species. Only the forked tips protrude from the mouth through a divided notch in the middle of the rostral scale. The nostrils have valves consisting of a specialized spongy tissue to exclude water, and the windpipe can be drawn up to where the short nasal passage opens into the roof of the mouth. This is an important adaptation for an animal that must surface to breathe, but may have its head partially submerged when doing so. The lung has become very large and extends almost the entire length of the body, although the rear portion is thought to have developed to aid buoyancy rather than to exchange gases. The extended lung possibly also serves to store air for dives.

Most species of sea snakes are able to respire through the top of their skin. This is unusual for reptiles, because their skin is thick and scaly, but experiments with the black-and-yellow sea snake, Hydrophis platurus (a pelagic species), have shown this species can satisfy about 25% of its oxygen requirements in this manner, which allows for prolonged dives.

Like other land animals that have adapted to life in a marine environment, sea snakes ingest considerably more salt than their terrestrial relatives through their diets, and when seawater is inadvertently swallowed. Because of this, a more effective means of regulating the salt concentration of their blood is required. In sea snakes, the posterior sublingual glands, located under and around the tongue sheath, allow them to expel salt with their tongue action.

Scalation among sea snakes is highly variable. As opposed to terrestrial snake species that have imbricate scales to protect against abrasion, the scales of most pelagic sea snakes do not overlap. Reef-dwelling species, such as Aipysurus, do have imbricate scales to protect against the sharp coral. The scales themselves may be smooth, keeled, spiny, or granular, the latter often looking like warts. Pelamis has body scales that are "peg-like", while those on its tail are juxtaposed hexagonal plates.

Sensory abilities 
Vision, chemoreception (tongue-flicking), and hearing are important senses for terrestrial snakes, but these stimuli become distorted in water. The poor visibility, chemical dilution, and limitation of ground-borne vibrations under water suggest that sea snakes and sea kraits may have unique sensory abilities to compensate for the relative lack of other sensory cues.

Relatively little is known about sea snake vision. A study of photoreceptors in the retina of spine-bellied, Lapemis curtus, and horned, Acalyptophis peronii, sea snakes found three classes of opsins all from cone cells. Despite the absence of rod cells in sea snake eyes, Simeos et al. found the rhodopsin (rh1), the opsin of the rods, still expressed suggesting that in sea snakes some cones may be transmuted rods. Behavioural observations indicate that vision has a limited role for catching prey and mate selection, but sound vibrations and chemoreception may be important. One study identified small sensory organs on the head of Lapemis curtus similar to the mechanoreceptors in alligators and aquatic snake Acrochodus that are used to sense the movement of fish prey. Westhoff et al. recorded auditory brain responses to vibration underwater in Lapemis curtus, which are sensitive enough to detect movement in prey, but were not as sensitive as fish lateral line systems. Similarly, vision appears to be of limited importance for finding mates. Shine experimented with applying skin secretions (pheromones) to snake-like objects to see if male turtle-headed sea snakes, Emydocephalus annulatus, are attracted to female pheromones. Shine found that although vision may be useful over short distances (less than ), pheromones are more important once the male comes in physical contact with an object.

The olive sea snake, Aipysurus laevis, has been found to have photoreceptors in the skin of its tail, allowing it to detect light and presumably ensuring it is completely hidden, including its tail, inside coral holes during the day. While other species have not been tested, A. laevis possibly is not unique among sea snakes in this respect.

Other unique senses, such as electromagnetic reception and pressure detection, have been proposed for sea snakes, but scientific studies have yet to be performed to test these senses.

Distribution and habitat
Sea snakes are mostly confined to the warm tropical waters of the Indian Ocean and the western Pacific Ocean, with a few species found well out into Oceania.  The geographic range of one species, Pelamis platurus, is wider than that of any other reptile species, except for a few species of sea turtles. It extends from the east coast of Africa, from Djibouti in the north to Cape Town in the south, across the Indian Ocean, the Pacific, south as far as the northern coast of New Zealand, all the way to the western coast of the Americas, where it occurs from northern Peru in the south (including the Galápagos Islands) to the Gulf of California in the north. Isolated specimens have been found as far north as San Diego and Oxnard in the United States.

Sea snakes do not occur in the Atlantic Ocean.  Pelamis possibly would be found there were it not for the cold currents off Namibia and western South Africa that keep it from crossing into the eastern South Atlantic, or south of 5°S latitude along the South American west coast. Sea snakes do not occur in the Red Sea, believed to be due to its increased salinity, so no danger exists of them crossing through the Suez Canal. A lack of salinity is also thought to be the reason why Pelamis has not crossed into the Caribbean via the Panama Canal.

Despite their marine adaptations, most sea snakes prefer shallow waters near land, around islands, and especially somewhat sheltered waters, as well as near estuaries. Others, such as P. platurus, are pelagic and are found in drift lines, slicks of floating debris brought together by surface currents. Some sea snakes inhabit mangrove swamps and similar brackishwater habitats, and two landlocked freshwater forms are found: Hydrophis semperi occurs in Lake Taal in the Philippines, and Laticauda crockeri in Lake Te Nggano on Rennell Island in the Solomon Islands.

Behavior
Sea snakes are generally reluctant to bite, and are usually considered to be mild-tempered, although variation is seen among species and individuals. Some species, such as P. platurus, which feed by simply gulping down their prey, are more likely to bite when provoked because they seem to use their venom more for defense. Others, such as Laticauda spp., use their venom for prey immobilization. Sea snakes are often handled without concern by local fishermen who unravel and toss them back into the water barehanded, usually without getting bitten, when the snakes frequently become entangled in fishing nets. Species reported as much more aggressive include Aipysurus laevis, Astrotia stokesii, Enhydrina schistosa, Enhydrina zweifeli, and Hydrophis ornatus.

On land, their movements become very erratic. They crawl awkwardly in these situations and can become quite aggressive, striking wildly at anything that moves, although they are unable to coil and strike in the manner of terrestrial snakes.

Sea snakes appear to be active both day and night. In the morning, and sometimes late in the afternoon, they can be seen at the surface basking in the sunlight, and they dive when disturbed.

Sea snakes have been sighted in huge numbers. The cause of this phenomenon is unknown, although it likely has to do with reproduction. They can sometimes be seen swimming in schools of several hundred, and many dead specimens have been found on beaches after typhoons.

Ecology
They feed on small fish and occasionally young octopus. They are often associated with the sea snake barnacle (Platylepas ophiophila), which attaches to their skin.

Reproduction
Except for a single genus, all sea snakes are ovoviviparous; the young are born alive in the water where they live their entire lives. In some species, the young are quite large, up to half as long as the mother. The one exception is the genus Laticauda, which is oviparous; its five species all lay their eggs on land.

Venom
Like their relatives in the family Elapidae, the majority of sea snakes are highly venomous. They rarely inject their venom when biting, so poisonous bites to humans are rare. For example, Hydrophis platurus has a venom more potent than any terrestrial snake species in Costa Rica based on LD50, but despite its abundance in the waters off its western coast, few human fatalities have been reported. The death of a trawler fisherman in Australian waters during 2018 was reported to be the region's first sea snake fatality since a pearl diver was killed in 1935.

Bites in which envenomation does occur are usually painless and may not even be noticed when contact is made. Teeth may remain in the wound. Usually, little or no swelling occurs, and rarely are any nearby lymph nodes affected. The most important symptoms are rhabdomyolysis (rapid breakdown of skeletal muscle tissue) and paralysis. Early symptoms include headache, a thick-feeling tongue, thirst, sweating, and vomiting. The venom is very slow acting and symptoms that happen from little as 30 minutes to several hours after the bite include generalized aching, stiffness, and tenderness of muscles all over the body. Passive stretching of the muscles is also painful, and trismus, which is similar to tetanus, is common. This is followed later on by symptoms typical of other elapid envenomations, a progressive flaccid paralysis, starting with ptosis and paralysis of voluntary muscles. Paralysis of muscles involved in swallowing and respiration can be fatal.

Vick et al (1975) estimated that the LD50 of three sea snake venoms (H. platurus, L. semifasciata and L. laticaudata) for a 70 kg human range from 7.7 to 21 mg. Data from the only sea snake venom conducted in monkeys at that time suggested that primates were slightly more resistant to the venom effects on a dose response basis than mice. In this regard, recall the recent report by Ishikawa et al (1985) indicating a substantially lower binding affinity between sea snake neurotoxin and human and chimpanzee AChR's compared to that in other animals. In humans, the venom targets appear mainly to be the cell walls of voluntary (skeletal) muscles and distal tubular portions of the kidney including the loop of Henle, the second convoluted tubule and the collecting tubules. Sitprija et al (1973) found evidence of tubular necrosis throughout all portions of the renal tubules in two patients severely envenomated by sea snakes. Sea snake venoms in humans are thus more often myotoxic and/or nephrotoxic rather than neurotoxic.

Taxonomy

Sea snakes were at first regarded as a unified and separate family, the Hydrophiidae, that later came to comprise two subfamilies: the Hydrophiinae, or true/aquatic sea snakes (now 6 genera with 64 species), and the more primitive Laticaudinae, or sea kraits (one genus, Laticauda, with eight species). Eventually, as just how closely related the sea snakes are to the elapids became clear, the taxonomic situation became less well-defined. Some taxonomists responded by moving the sea snakes to the Elapidae. Most taxonomists now place the sea snakes in the elapid subfamilies Hydrophiinae and Laticaudinae, although the latter may be omitted if Laticauda is included in the Hydrophiinae. Unlike the traditional Hydrophiinae, the Hydrophiinae as currently seen also includes Australasian terrestrial elapids.

Molecular studies

Molecular data studies suggest all three monotypic semiaquatic genera (Ephalophis, Parahydrophis and Hydrelaps) are early diverging lineages.

Captivity

At best, sea snakes make difficult captives. Ditmars (1933) described them as nervous and delicate captives that usually refuse to eat, preferring only to hide in the darkest corner of the tank. Over 50 years later, Mehrtens wrote in 1987 that although they were rarely displayed in Western zoological parks, some species were regularly on display in Japanese aquariums. The available food supply limits the number of species that can be kept in captivity, since some have diets that are too specialized. Also, some species appear intolerant of handling, or even being removed from the water. Species that have done relatively well in captivity include the ringed sea snake, Hydrophis cyanocinctus, which feeds on fish and eels in particular. Pelamis platurus has done especially well in captivity, accepting small fish, including goldfish. Housing them in round tanks, or in rectangular tanks with well-rounded corners, prevents snakes from damaging their snouts on the sides.

Conservation status
Most sea snakes are not on the CITES protection lists. One species, Laticauda crockeri, is classified as vulnerable. Several species of Aipysurus are listed with conservation status of greater concern, the Timor species A. fuscus is known to be endangered, and two others found in seas north of Australia, the leaf-scaled A. foliosquama and short-nosed A. apraefrontalis, are classified as critically endangered according to the IUCN Red List of Threatened Species.

See also
 List of marine reptiles
 Snakebite
 Sea serpent

References

Further reading

 Graham JB, Lowell WR, Rubinoff I, Motta J. 1987. Surface and subsurface swimming of the sea snake Pelamis platurus. J. exp. Biol. 127, 27-44. PDF at the [Journal of Experimental Biology]. Accessed 7 August 2007.
 Rasmussen AR. 1997. Systematics of sea snakes; a critical review. Symp. Zool. Soc. London 70, 15-30.
 Smith MA. 1926. Monograph of the sea snakes (Hydrophiidae). British Museum of Natural History, London.
 Voris HK. 1977. A phylogeny of the sea snakes (Hydrophiidae). Fieldiana Zool. 70, 79-169.
 Whitaker R. 1978. Common Indian Snakes: A Field Guide. Macmillan India Limited.

External links
Sea Snakes in Australia
Sea Snakes at Scubadoc's Diving Medicine Online. Accessed 6 August 2007.
Diving Gunung Api: Volcano Of The Sea Snakes - first hand account of scuba divers interacting with sea snakes at the Indonesian volcano Gunung Api, June 2009

 
Taxa named by Malcolm Arthur Smith